Rewley may refer to:

 Rewley Abbey, Oxford, England
 Rewley House, Kellogg College, Oxford, England

See also 
 Oxford Rewley Road railway station, Oxford, England